Ștefăneștii de Jos is a commune in the centre of Ilfov County, Muntenia, Romania. Its name means "Lower Ștefănești", derived from Ștefan (Stephan) and suffix -ești. The commune is composed of three villages: Crețuleasca, Ștefăneștii de Jos and Ștefăneștii de Sus.

References

Communes in Ilfov County
Localities in Muntenia